Promoschorhynchus is a genus of akidnognathid therocephalians from the Late Permian and Early Triassic of South Africa. Unlike many other therapsids, Promoschorhynchus survived the Permian-Triassic extinction event.

References

Akidnognathids
Therocephalia genera
Lopingian synapsids of Africa
Fossil taxa described in 1954
Lopingian genus first appearances
Changhsingian genera
Induan genera
Early Triassic genus extinctions